Conrad Stafford Bain (February 4, 1923 – January 14, 2013) was a Canadian-American comedian and actor. His television credits include a leading role as Phillip Drummond in the sitcom Diff'rent Strokes (1978–1986), as Dr. Arthur Harmon on Maude (1972–1978), and as Charlie Ross in Mr. President (1987–1988).

Early life
Conrad Bain was born in Lethbridge, Alberta, the son of Jean Agnes (née Young) and Stafford Harrison Bain, 
who was a wholesaler. He was an identical twin.  His twin, Bonar Bain, was also an actor.  He studied at the Banff School of Fine Arts before serving in the Canadian Army during World War II. He later studied in New York at the American Academy of Dramatic Arts, graduating in 1948; one of his classmates was comedian Don Rickles.  Bain became a naturalized citizen of the United States in 1946.

Career
After a stint at the Stratford Festival in Canada, Bain had further success as a stage actor in the 1956 revival of Eugene O'Neill's The Iceman Cometh.<ref name="star">Conrad Bain at starpulse.com</ref>  The New York Times reviewer noted that his role was "especially well acted."   Bain's Broadway theatre credits include Candide, Advise and Consent, An Enemy of the People, Uncle Vanya, and On Borrowed Time. Off Broadway, he appeared in the original run of Steambath.  While doing stage work in New York City, Bain also found work on television, appearing in the cult supernatural soap opera Dark Shadows as the town innkeeper, Mr. Wells, during seasons 1 and 2. His character was killed off by werewolf Chris Jennings (Don Briscoe).

In the early 1960s, Bain was one of the principal organizers of the Actors Federal Credit Union. In an article in the Credit Union Times, he recalled that "the effort grew out of the fact that, at least in the world of financial services, actors and other performers got no respect and, more importantly, no access to credit."

He wrote:

Bain served as the credit union's first president.

In the early 1970s, Bain appeared in New York–based films like Lovers and Other Strangers and Woody Allen's Bananas before achieving national recognition for his work in television. He is best known for his roles as Dr. Arthur Harmon, Bea Arthur's title character's conservative nemesis, who married her best friend, Vivian, in Maude (1972–78). He then starred in Diff'rent Strokes (1978–86) as Park Avenue millionaire Phillip Drummond, who adopted two African-American orphaned boys from Harlem, Willis and Arnold, to live with him and his daughter, Kimberly, and housekeeper, Mrs. Garrett. In 1979, he played Phillip Drummond in an episode of The Facts of Life. In 1996, Bain reprised his role of Phillip Drummond alongside Gary Coleman as Arnold Jackson on the series finale of The Fresh Prince of Bel-Air.

Personal life
Bain had two sons and a daughter with Monica Sloan (1923–2009), to whom he wed in 1945; they remained married until her death in 2009. Bain's identical twin brother was actor Bonar Bain (1923–2005), who once played Arnold Harmon, the twin brother of Conrad's Maude'' character, Arthur Harmon.

Death
Bain died from a stroke on January 14, 2013, in Livermore, California, at the age of 89. His body was cremated.

Filmography

Film

Television

References

External links

 
 
 
 
 

1923 births
2013 deaths
Canadian emigrants to the United States
Canadian Army personnel of World War II
Canadian male film actors
Canadian male television actors
Identical twin male actors
20th-century Canadian male actors
People from Lethbridge
People from Livermore, California
Male actors from Alberta
American twins
Canadian twins
20th-century American male actors
People educated at Western Canada High School
Naturalized citizens of the United States